Zoltán Gyimesi (born 31 March 1977) is a Hungarian chess grandmaster and national champion in 2005. He has participated in four Chess Olympiads (1998, 2002, 2004, 2006) with a record of +11=18-4. In 2002, at the 35th Chess Olympiad, the Hungarian team won the silver medal with Gyimesi on the fourth board.

In 2004, he tied for 1st-6th with Evgeniy Najer, Artyom Timofeev, Kaido Külaots, Sergey Grigoriants and Oleg Korneev in the Cappelle-la-Grande Open. In 2005 he won the Hungarian Chess Championship, the EU Individual Open Chess Championship and the European Rapid Chess Championship.

Gyimesi is married to IM Nóra Medvegy.

References

External links
Zoltan Gyimesi games at 365Chess.com

1977 births
Living people
Hungarian chess players
Chess grandmasters
Chess Olympiad competitors